Thomas Charles Williams (born February 7, 1951) was a Canadian ice hockey player who played in the National Hockey League with the New York Rangers and Los Angeles Kings from 1972 to 1979.

Career
Williams was chosen by the New York Rangers in the second round of the 1971 NHL Amateur Draft, 27th overall. He played for the Rangers from 1971–72 through early in the 1973–74 season, when he was traded to the Los Angeles Kings on November 30. His best season came in 1976–77 when he scored 35 goals along with 39 assists. He was traded to the St. Louis Blues following the 1978–79 season, but his only action following the trade was a short stint with the Salt Lake Golden Eagles in the CHL. He retired with career totals of 115 goals and 138 assists in 399 NHL games.

Career statistics

Regular season and playoffs

External links
 

1951 births
Living people
Canadian ice hockey left wingers
Ice hockey people from Ontario
Hamilton Red Wings (OHA) players
Los Angeles Kings players
New York Rangers draft picks
New York Rangers players
Omaha Knights (CHL) players
Providence Reds players
Salt Lake Golden Eagles (CHL) players
Sportspeople from Windsor, Ontario
Springfield Indians players